North Ruskin is an unincorporated community located in southeastern Hillsborough County, Florida, United States, north of Ruskin. The community is served by a 33572 ZIP Code. It is part of the census-designated place (CDP) of Apollo Beach.

Geography 
North Ruskin  is located at latitude 27.765 north and longitude 82.395 west, or approximately four miles north of Ruskin. The elevation of the community is three feet above sea level.

Education
The community of North Ruskin is served by Hillsborough County Schools, which serves the entire county.

References

External links
North Ruskin page from Hometown Locator

Unincorporated communities in Hillsborough County, Florida
Unincorporated communities in Florida